Woodsdale is an unincorporated community in Madison and St. Clair Townships in central Butler County, Ohio, United States about three miles northeast of Hamilton.  It was established in 1867 by the Beckett Paper Company and was formerly a stop on the Cincinnati, Hamilton, and Dayton Railroad.  An electric generation plant of the Cincinnati Gas and Electric Company is located in Woodsdale. Woodsdale is also the location of the Samuel Augspurger House & Farm and The Augspurger Schoolhouse both of which are on the National Register of Historic Places. Woodsdale was also known for the Woodsdale Island Amusement Park.

References

Further reading
Bert S. Barlow, W.H. Todhunter, Stephen D. Cone, Joseph J. Pater, and Frederick Schneider, eds.  Centennial History of Butler County, Ohio.  Hamilton, Ohio:  B.F. Bowen, 1905.
Butler County Engineer's Office.  Butler County Official Transportation Map, 2003.  Fairfield Township, Butler County, Ohio:  The Office, 2003.
A History and Biographical Cyclopaedia of Butler County, Ohio with Illustrations and Sketches of Its Representative Men and Pioneers.  Cincinnati, Ohio:  Western Biographical Publishing Company, 1882.

Populated places established in 1867
Unincorporated communities in Butler County, Ohio
Unincorporated communities in Ohio